The ocellated dragonet or scooter dragonet (Neosynchiropus ocellatus) is a species of tropical marine fish in the family Callionymidae. It is native to the southwest Pacific Ocean from southern Japan to the Marquesan Islands.

Name
The scooter dragonet is often referred to as the ocellated dragonet and, in the aquarium trade, as the scooter blenny. This often causes confusion because many then believe that the species is a member of the blenny family when it is actually not. The same species is also occasionally listed under the scientific name Neosynchiropus ocellatus, and many mistakenly believe they are separate species.

Description
Viewed from above, it is distinctly diamond-shaped with the horizontal pectoral fins located at its widest point. It is brown and tan with a striped or spotted pattern- males are usually more colorful and have a large sail-like dorsal fin that is bright orange at the base.

Habitat
The scooter dragonet is a reef-associated bottom dwelling fish that inhabits shallow, tropical waters, usually sandy lagoons or rocky reefs. They tend to form loose congregations of several individuals, but do not exhibit schooling behavior or other forms of social cooperation. Scooter dragonets' diet consists almost entirely of Copepods: small zooplankton living in the water column. However, in captivity the Scooter Dragonet can often be acclimated to consuming live, frozen or even artificial foods, such as flakes.

References

External links
 Fishes of Australia : Neosynchiropus ocellatus
 

ocellated dragonet
Marine fish of Northern Australia
Fish described in 1770